Philip Arthur Heath (born 24 September 1954) is a former Australian politician. He was a Member of the Queensland Legislative Assembly.

Early life 
He was born in Brisbane to Henry J. G. Heath OAM, a naval officer, and Daphne Beryl, née Landry. After attending primary school at Bulimba and then Brisbane Grammar School, he became a salesman and departmental manager of a boat and motorcycle dealership from 1972. From 1984 he owned boating and waterski retail and wholesale businesses and was a member of various local community groups.

Politics 
Heath was a member of the Labor Party, serving on the State Council, and the Consumer Affairs, Law, and Administration Policy Committees. He was also vice-president of the Lilley Division Executive and secretary of the Kalinga/Wooloowin branch. In 1989 he was elected to the Queensland Legislative Assembly as the member for Nundah, but he resigned in 1991 over political disappointments and personal problems.

Later life 
Returning to the Harley-Davidson motorcycle dealership, he became Manager covering Rider Equipment, Clothing, Parts and Accessories, and other business-facets for all Harley-Davidson Dealerships in Queensland, New Zealand, and New Caledonia. In 2012 he retired to become a part-time consultant and columnist for magazines.

While retaining a role as a magazine contributor, he later re-started Harley-Davidson dealership work in New Zealand where he currently resides. From late 2019, he has retired from full-time work, and is again a part-time consultant for the Harley-Davidson industry, and writes regularly for motorcycle magazines.

References

1954 births
Living people
Members of the Queensland Legislative Assembly
Australian Labor Party members of the Parliament of Queensland